Jordan Grantz (born 5 December 1992) is an American Samoan international footballer who played college soccer in the United States for North Carolina Wesleyan College as a midfielder.

References

1992 births
Living people
American Samoan footballers
American Samoa international footballers
Sportspeople from Fredericksburg, Virginia
Soccer players from Virginia
North Carolina Wesleyan College alumni
Association football midfielders